The 2005 European Baseball Championship was won by the Netherlands. It was held in the Czech Republic.The top 4 qualified for the 2007 Baseball World Cup.

Round 1

Pool A

Standings

Source: http://catcher.home.xs4all.nl

Pool B

Standings

Source: http://catcher.home.xs4all.nl

Round 2

Pool C

Standings

Source: http://catcher.home.xs4all.nl

Pool D

Standings

Source: http://catcher.home.xs4all.nl

Classification game

3rd/4th place game

Source: http://catcher.home.xs4all.nl

Final

Source: http://catcher.home.xs4all.nl

Final standings

References

External links
 Official site

European Baseball Championship
European Baseball Championship
2005
2005 in Czech sport
European Baseball Championship